AR-1 may refer to
 AR-1 (rocket engine)
 Arkansas's 1st congressional district
 Arkansas Highway 1
 An Acoustic Research corporation loudspeaker, famous as the first acoustic suspension speaker.
 The USS Medusa (AR-1), the first US Navy repair ship
 AR-1 (multiple rocket launcher)
 The AR-1 "Parasniper", a bolt-action rifle manufactured by ArmaLite